"These Days" is a song by English drum and bass band Rudimental, featuring British singers Jess Glynne and Dan Caplen as well as American rapper Macklemore. It was released on 19 January 2018 as the second single from Rudimental's third studio album, Toast to Our Differences, following their UK top 10 hit "Sun Comes Up".

After spending a record-tying seven weeks at number two, the song reached number one in the UK on 30 March 2018, becoming Rudimental's third UK number-one single, Glynne's sixth, and both Macklemore (as a solo artist) and Caplen's first. This also made Glynne the British female solo artist with the most UK chart-toppers in history. The song also reached number one in Austria, Czech Republic, Latvia, Norway and Scotland, as well as the top 10 in numerous countries including Australia, Belgium, Denmark, Germany, Ireland, Italy, Netherlands, New Zealand, Sweden, and Switzerland.

Background
Dan Caplen, Jamie Scott, Julian Bunetta and John Ryan wrote a demo for "These Days" in 2016. After it was produced by Rudimental, Caplen showed it to Macklemore in Los Angeles and he was excited to feature on it. The final vocalist to join was Jess Glynne, who added her vocals to the song after a studio session in 2017.

Music video
An official music video was released to Rudimental's YouTube channel on 25 January 2018. The video was filmed in London, directed by Johnny Valencia and produced by Shabana Mansuri.

Chart performance
On 26 January 2018, "These Days" entered the UK Singles Chart at number 33. Two weeks later it charted at number 2, held off the top spot by Drake's song "God's Plan". Drake kept Rudimental at bay for a total of seven weeks, giving the latter a record-equalling stint at number 2; the only other songs in UK chart history to spend that number of weeks at number 2 are All-4-One's "I Swear" (1994) and "Moves Like Jagger" (2011) by Maroon 5 featuring Christina Aguilera. On 30 March, "God's Plan" became subject to accelerated chart ratio (ACR) and "These Days" finally reached number 1.

Glynne and Cheryl previously jointly held the record for most number-one singles by a British woman, with five each, but Glynne gained the record in her own right when "These Days" reached the summit.

Rudimental, Glynne and Caplen performed the song live for the first time on The One Show on 7 February 2018.

Track listing

Charts

Weekly charts

Year-end charts

Decade-end charts

Certifications

References

2018 singles
2018 songs
Rudimental songs
Dan Caplen songs
Jess Glynne songs
Macklemore songs
Asylum Records singles
Number-one singles in Austria
Number-one singles in Iceland
Number-one singles in Norway
Number-one singles in Scotland
Song recordings produced by Rudimental
Songs written by Amir Amor
Songs written by Dan Caplen
Songs written by Jamie Scott
Songs written by Julian Bunetta
Songs written by John Ryan (musician)
Songs written by Macklemore
UK Singles Chart number-one singles
Song recordings produced by Mark Ralph (record producer)